Yendi Amira Phillipps (born 8 September 1985) is a Jamaican TV host, model and beauty queen who was the winner of the Miss Jamaica World 2007 beauty pageant, as well as the Miss Jamaica Universe 2010 pageant. She represented Jamaica at the Miss World 2007 contest held in Sanya, China and at Miss Universe 2010 held at the Mandalay Bay Resort and Casino, Las Vegas, Nevada, U.S. on 23 August 2010, where she finished as the first runner up to Ximena Navarrete of Mexico. After Miss Universe, Phillipps appeared in commercials for brands such as Toyota.

Miss World 2007
She placed in  Miss World Beach Beauty, Miss World Sports, Miss World Talent, Miss World Top Model and the Beauty With A Purpose Award. The Jamaican beauty made Miss World history and was the first contestant to ever place in all of the fast track events listed above. During the telecast, she made the final top 16.

Miss Universe 2010
She was crowned Miss Jamaica Universe 2010 on 3 July 2010, and represented Jamaica at the Miss Universe 2010 pageant in Las Vegas on 23 August 2010, run by Donald Trump. Phillipps scored the highest in swimsuit and came in second in evening gown, entering the final question round in second place with a score of 8.884. She became the first runner up behind Mexico.

She is one of only nine former Miss World semifinalists to place in the Miss Universe semifinals, the others being Michelle McLean of Namibia in 1992, compatriot Christine Straw of Jamaica in 2004, Ada de la Cruz of the Dominican Republic in 2009, Patricia Yurena Rodríguez of Spain in 2013, Olivia Jordan of the USA in 2015, Catriona Gray of the Philippines in 2018, and Julia Gama of Brazil and Andrea Meza of Mexico, both in 2020 (coincidentally Phillipps, de la Cruz, Rodriguez, and Gama all finished as 1st Runner-Up). McLean, Grey and Meza were first place winners.

2010–present: After Miss Universe 
Phillipps currently holds a bachelor's degree of fine arts with a concentration in dance from The College at Brockport, State University of New York and a master's degree in Recreation and Leisure Management. After the Miss Universe pageant, Phillipps appeared in an American ad campaign for the car brand Toyota. Phillipps has also appeared in commercials for Pepsi Refresh in the US and the Sprite campaign in India. Yendi Phillipps has also appeared in publications such as Skywritings magazine, Caribbean Beat magazine, Woman & Home, Fair Lady, Buzz, Collage, Soul, Basia and Ocean Style. Phillipps has also hosted Digicel Rising Stars. On 22 April 2012, Yendi announced via her Facebook fan page that she was pregnant. On 21 September 2012, she gave birth to a 7-pound, 11-ounce baby girl named Israel.

Personal life
Her father is Haleem Phillipps, who is of Lebanese descent.

References

External links 
 

she wqs not 1st runner up in 2010 she was miss universe

1985 births
Jamaican female models
Jamaican people of Dougla descent
Jamaican people of Lebanese descent
Living people
Miss Universe 2010 contestants
Miss World 2007 delegates
People from Kingston, Jamaica
Miss Jamaica World winners
Jamaican beauty pageant winners